Andrew Meikle (5 May 1719 – 27 November 1811) was a Scottish mechanical engineer credited with inventing the threshing machine, a device used to remove the outer husks from grains of wheat. He also had a hand in assisting Firbeck in the invention of the Rotherham Plough. This was regarded as one of the key developments of the British Agricultural Revolution in the late 18th century. The invention was made around 1786, although some say he only improved on an earlier design by a Scottish farmer named Leckie.
Michael Stirling is said to have invented a rotary threshing machine in 1758 which for forty years was used to process all the corn on his farm at Gateside, no published works have yet been found but his son William made a sworn statement to his minister to this fact, he also gave him the details of his father's death in 1796.

Earlier (c.1772), he also invented windmill "spring sails", which replaced the simple canvas designs previously used with sails made from a series of shutters that could be operated by levers, allowing windmill sails to be quickly and safely controlled in the event of a storm.

Meikle worked as a millwright at Houston Mill in East Linton, East Lothian, and inspired John Rennie to become a noted civil engineer.

He died at Houston Mill and is buried in East Linton's Prestonkirk Parish Church kirkyard, close to Rennie's father, George Rennie, who farmed the nearby Phantassie estate by the River Tyne.

In 2011 he was one of seven inaugural inductees to the Scottish Engineering Hall of Fame.

See also
List of places in East Lothian
Phantassie Doocot

References

External links
Gazetteer for Scotland entry for Andrew Meikle

1719 births
1811 deaths
People from East Lothian
People associated with wind power
Millwrights
Scottish inventors
Scottish engineers
18th-century Scottish people
18th-century British engineers
18th-century Scottish scientists
Scottish Engineering Hall of Fame inductees